Ivan Sokolov (Cyrillic: Иван Соколов; born 13 June 1968) is a Dutch-Bosnian chess player and writer. He was awarded the title of Grandmaster (GM) by FIDE in 1987. Sokolov won the 1988 Yugoslav Championship and in 1995 and 1998 the Dutch Championship.

Before earning the GM title, he became a FIDE Master in 1985 and an International Master in 1986. In 1987 and 1993, he won the Vidmar Memorial.

In 2000, he won the 1st European Rapid Chess Championship in Neum edging out on tiebreak Alexey Dreev and Zurab Azmaiparashvili.

Following his playing career, Sokolov has become a successful chess trainer. From 2013 - 2016, he worked as a coach and second for Salem Saleh and served as the trainer of the United Arab Emirates national team. In 2016, he left his job in the UAE to coach Iran's national team, a position that included extensive work with Alireza Firouzja. Sokolov became the coach of the Uzbek national team in May 2022, leading them to victory in the Chennai Olympiad later that year.

Bibliography

References

External links
Ivan Sokolov chess games at 365Chess.com

1968 births
Living people
Chess grandmasters
Chess Olympiad competitors
Dutch chess players
Bosnia and Herzegovina chess players
Yugoslav chess players
Dutch chess writers
Bosnia and Herzegovina emigrants to the Netherlands
People from Jajce